Barbara Piévic (born 10 April 1993), known professionally as Barbara Pravi, is a French singer, songwriter and actress. After signing with Capitol Music France in 2015, she released five extended plays with the label. Her debut album, On n'enferme pas les oiseaux, was released on 27 August 2021.

Pravi represented France in the Eurovision Song Contest 2021 with the song "", securing second place, the best result for France since 1991. 

As a songwriter, Pravi has written songs for a number of artists including Yannick Noah, Julie Zenatti, Chimène Badi, and Jaden Smith. She additionally composed "" by Valentina, which won the Junior Eurovision Song Contest 2020, and "" by Lissandro, which won the Junior Eurovision Song Contest 2022.

Early life 
Barbara Piévic was born in Paris on 10 April 1993. Her family primarily consists of artists and musicians. Pravi's father is of Serbian and Algerian Jewish descent, while her mother is of Polish Jewish and Iranian origin. Pravi's maternal grandfather is the Iranian painter Hossein Zenderoudi.

Career

2014–2018: Early career 
Pravi began her music career in 2014, after meeting French musician Jules Jaconelli. With Jaconelli, she began composing songs. The following year, she released an original song titled "", which led to her signing a contract with Capitol Music France. She adopted the stage name Barbara Pravi from the Serbian word  (in the masculine), as a homage to her Serbian grandfather. Pravi has cited her musical influences as Barbara, Jacques Brel, Georges Brassens, Françoise Hardy, and Aragon. Upon beginning her professional recording career, Pravi performed on the soundtrack of the French version of the Swiss film Heidi with the song "" and afterwards was cast as Solange Duhamel in the musical show  in November 2016, performing songs written by Jean-Jacques Goldman, Charles Aznavour and Maxime Le Forestier.

In 2017, Pravi released her first official single "". The single was later included on her self-titled debut extended play, which was released the following year. Also in 2017, Pravi starred in the television film , as the role of Marion, was later broadcast on France 2 in December 2019. From 2017 until 2018, Pravi performed on the 55 Tour, supporting French singer Florent Pagny. At the end of 2018, Pravi decided to alter her musical style by adopting a more traditional French  style, rather than the pop style that had dominated her early releases.

Along with writing and composing her own songs, Pravi has written for several other artists including Yannick Noah, Julie Zenatti, Chimène Badi, Jaden Smith, Louane and Florent Pagny.

2019–2021: Junior Eurovision Song Contest/ Eurovision Song Contest

Participations 
In the year 2019 she wrote the song "Bim Bam toi" with Igit, with which Carla Lazzari represented France at the Junior Eurovision Song Contest 2019 in Gliwice and ultimately took 5th place. Bim Bam Toi, which has been reposted millions of times on TikTok, won them France's first TikTok Gold in history in the history of the application. 

In the year 2020, she wrote the song "J'imagine" with Igit, with which Valentina Tronel represented France at the Junior Eurovision Song Contest 2020 in Warsaw and ultimately won. This entry gave France the first JESC victory in history, both in the jury and in the spectators. 

On January 30, 2021, she won Eurovision France, c'est vous qui décidez 2021, the French preliminary decision, for the ESC 2021 with the song Voilà. Ultimately, at the Eurovision song contest she finished second behind Måneskin won ESC 2021 by a margin of 25 points. This year's entry achieved the best placement since Eurovision Song Contest 1991 (2nd place) and the highest score (499 points) since France's debut in the contest in 1956 (also known as the inaugural contest). Pravi was also often asked to represent France at Eurovision Song Contest but she turned it down as she didn't feel ready at the time to take on the challenge of the song contest.

2021-present: Post Eurovision-ventures 

Pravi performed "" as an interval act at the Junior Eurovision Song Contest 2021, which took place on 19 December in Paris, France.

On International Women's Day, 8 March 2022, Pravi released "".

On 13 July 2022, Pravi released "365", which is dedicated to all the fans who supported her in the past year.

On 21 December, Pravi was announced as Florence in the TV movie  to be premiered on France 3. It is expected to premiere on the same channel in mid-Autumn of 2023.  This was Pravi's third acting role after Un été 44 (2016)   and La sainte famille (2017, but premiered in 2019). It is also credited on her portfolio that she starred in Barbara Pravi (voilà qui je suis), a documentary about herself, in 2021.

Pravi announced on 6 January 2023 that she had signed to Virgin Records France after eight years at Capitol Music France. She revealed two days later that she was preparing her second full-length album. She is working on this alongside her television movie debut in Adieu Vinyle, a TV movie which is set to premiere on France 3 in mid-Autumn 2023.

On 13 January 2023, she was announced as a temporary host on the BBC Sounds podcast show "Music Life". The first episode she hosted included November Ultra, Pi Ja Ma, Yaël Naïm and Melissa Lauveux as guests and the second episode described Pravi's tour playlist, "Sur la route" (On the Road). This appearance followed her French radio debut on RTL2's Foudre with Waxx, during which she co-hosted an episode with Waxx.

In late February 2023, she announced her first book Lève-toi and a single of that same title. Lève-toi will be a book in French and Arabic. It is a collaboration with Editions Julliard, author Huriya Asmahan, translator Aref Al-Haidari, singer-songwriter-actress Megan Chung, singer-songwriter Emel and manager Élodie Filleul. The song is to be released on 8 March for International Women's Day, while the book will be available in libraries worldwide on 9 March.

Personal life
Pravi has a deep connection with Persian literature, as her maternal grandfather is of Iranian descent. As a survivor of domestic violence, Pravi is active in the fight to end violence against women. She has frequently contributed to music initiatives intended to promote causes involved with women's rights. Pravi was also invited to perform "Notes pour trop tard" and speak at Emlyon Business School through TEDx to speak about her career and how she found self-confidence.

Discography

Studio albums

Extended plays

Singles

Collaborations and covers
2018:
Something Stupid cover with Calum Scott on Taratata 
 You Are The Reason French Version with Calum Scott
 Debout les femmes participation 
 Kid cover originally by Eddy De Pretto 

2019:
 Notes pour trop tard cover originally by Orelsan 
 Composition of Ma Voie album by Angelina Nava
 Composition of Bleu Indigo album by Yannick Noah 
 Composition of Chimeme Badi album by Chiméme Badi 
 Composition and backing vocals  of Jaden Smith's Erys.

2020:
 Composition of Les force contraines album by Terrenoire 
 La fin de monde with Terrenoire 
 Foule Sentimentale cover with Gaëtan Roussel 

2021:
 Ma plus belle histoire d’amour cover with Carla Bruni

2022: 
 Composition and featuring in Terrenoire's second album 
 Tama with Fatoumata Diawara
 Daughters of Cyrus with Aida Nostrat and Golfshifteh Farahani                                           
2023:
Composition of "143 Replay" on Dreamday's first album Voyage 091.
Composition of "Time's Up" on Dreamday's second mini-album On Lock.

Filmography

2016- 
Un été 44 (Solange Duhamel)
2017-
La sainte famille (Marion)
2023-
The Search (Leeseo)
Adieu Vinyle (Florence)
Un été 44 No2 (Solange Duhamel)

Awards and nominations

References

External links

1993 births
21st-century French singers
21st-century French women singers
Eurovision Song Contest entrants for France
Eurovision Song Contest entrants of 2021
Musicians from Paris
French women singer-songwriters
French singer-songwriters
French people of Algerian-Jewish descent
French people of Polish-Jewish descent
French people of Iranian descent
French people of Serbian descent
French pop singers
Living people